King's Langley Priory was a  Dominican priory in Kings Langley, Hertfordshire, England. It was located adjacent to the Kings Langley Royal Palace, residence of the Plantagenet English kings.

History

Langley was founded in 1308 by Edward II in fulfilment of a vow made when in peril. On 1 December, the king made the friars a grant of £100 a year until further orders; on 20 December he gave them his garden near the church and land there for building, and the next day assigned to them as a dwelling until the priory could be built a place called 'Little London.' The first prior was John de Warefeld, who had for some time belonged to Edward's household, and in August 1315 became his confessor.

The king in March 1312 gave the brothers 700 marks for building expenses, and in the summer of that year the conventual church was dedicated and a cemetery consecrated. Possibly, however, the church was not yet finished, for the body of Piers Gaveston, who was killed about this time, was not buried there until the end of 1314, when the ceremony took place with much state, the Archbishop of Canterbury and four bishops as well as many other ecclesiastics taking part in the funeral rites.

In October 1311 the king increased the annual income of the house to £150 to provide for fifteen friars added since the foundation, so that his grant in September 1312 of 500 marks during pleasure may have been intended for building purposes. He gave the friars in June 1315 a house with closes in his manor of Langley and leave to take wood for fuel and other necessaries from Chipperfield Wood. During some years of scarcity he also supplied them with corn.

The king, however, felt that this state of dependence on the Exchequer was unsatisfactory, and wished to endow them permanently. To overcome the difficulty that friars-preachers could not own property he proposed to found a house of Dominican nuns, who were to hold lands in trust for the brothers, and in 1318 he sent two friars to the pope for his authorization. Robert de Duffeld, the second Prior of King's Langley and the king's confessor, had been dispatched in October 1316 to the master of the order, apparently on the same errand, but nothing was done in the matter for years.

The drawback to allowances is shown in the complaint of the friars to Edward III in 1345 that owing to the irregularity of the payments from the Exchequer they had not wherewith to live, carry on the works they had begun, and pay their debts. On this occasion, at their request, the money due to the king from the alien priory of Harmondsworth was assigned to them in part payment.

Edward III seems to have been as much interested in the house as his father had been. In 1346 he granted the friars part of a quarry in Shotover for their works, and in 1347 gave them leave to enlarge the ditch round their close 3 ft. in breadth and 2,000 ft. in length. He gave them in April 1358 the fishery of his water of King's Langley with permission to have a weir in that water, and free entrance and exit to and from the weir through his park; also the head of a stream in Abbots Langley with leave to dig up his land in making an aqueduct underground to their house. In January 1361-2 he gave them, moreover, £20 a year during pleasure to their new work. Personal feeling seems to have prompted his grant in 1358 of 4 tuns of wine a year, and the gift in 1377 of forty mazers, one of which was called the Edward. The wish of Edward II was at last carried out in 1349, and a house of Dominican sisters founded at Dartford in Kent, which was regarded as the complement of the Dominican friary at King's Langley;[] and in December 1356 the prioress and nuns had licence to acquire in mortmain property to the value of £300 for the sustenance of themselves and the friars of King's Langley. Here the brothers possibly owed something to the influence of John Woderowe, the king's confessor, who in June 1356 is mentioned as their prior.

Still, the foundation of Dartford for some time did not change materially the financial position of Langley. The king in October 1363 granted to the convent of twenty brothers 200 marks a year of his alms and in March 1371 ordered that the money should be paid to them from the issues of the alien priory of Burstall.

But the appropriation of the church of Langley in 1374 to the nuns of Dartford is the beginning of a new arrangement. In October 1376 Edward III made over to John Duke of Lancaster, Simon Sudbury, Archbishop of Canterbury, and others in trust for the convent at Langley, the hundred and manor of Preston and the manors of Overland in Ash, Elmstone, Wadling in Ripple, Packmanstone in Newchurch, Harrietsham, 'Godmeston', Beaurepaire, Waldeslade in Chatham, Ham and Westgate in the Isle of Thanet, Kent, and these were granted to the friars from Easter 1382 for forty years, with the idea that during this term they might be secured to them in frankalmoin. The convent let them to Simon de Burley, who shortly afterwards received a grant of them in fee simple from Richard II. The brothers in 1383-4 represented to the king that the rent was much in arrears, and begged that King Edward's intention might be fulfilled and the lands given to them in mortmain; but this was not done, for in September 1386 the king assigned to them the farm of the alien priory of Ware instead of the manors held by Burley. After Burley's execution and forfeiture in 1388 the friars were allowed possession of the property pending inquiry into the king's right, but complained that they and their sureties were harassed by the Exchequer, while large sums due from Burley were still owing. The desired Letters patent were not, however, granted until 24 April 1399, when the king considering that the house of King's Langley 'was not yet sufficiently built and endowed, and as the foundation required', gave the manors to the nuns of Dartford in frankalmoin to hold for the friars. Five years earlier they had acquired in the same way from Richard II the advowson of Willian, Hertfordshire, and from John Waltham, Bishop of Salisbury, and Warin Waldegrave that of Great Gaddesden, with leave in both cases to appropriate the churches to their own uses.

When Richard died in February 1400 he was at first buried at Langley Priory; afterwards, however, his body was removed by order of Henry V to Westminster Abbey. But the conventual church of Langley still retained a sign of the priory's connexion with the royal family in the tomb of Edmund of Langley, Duke of York, interred here in 1402 beside his wife, Isabella, the daughter of Peter, King of Castile.

Henry IV in 1399 and Henry V in 1413 confirmed the grants made to the friars, who therefore could easily prove their title to the Kentish manors, when the escheator seized them in 1420 on the expiration of the term for which they had originally been given. The experience showed the expediency of royal confirmations, and the prior and convent obtained the ratification of their charters from Henry VI in 1424, Edward IV in 1466, Henry VII in 1486, and in 1510 from Henry VIII.

Richard Wycherley
The house seems to have been now provided with an income, not only assured but sufficient. The certain livelihood it offered is said to have been the reason why Richard Wycherley, a former prior promoted to be Bishop of 'Olivence', asked to be appointed prior again about 1497, and this time for life. He promised that he would live under the obedience of the provincial, enrich the house with his own possessions, require only the same living as priors usually had, and render due account of the revenues of the priory. The post was given to him, but according to the story of his successor the appointment was not to the convent's benefit: after four years of office he was £64 in debt to the house. In his last illness he desired that the sum should be paid, and in further recompense of charges on the priory caused by his episcopal dignity he bequeathed to the convent his crozier and mitre worth £40. After his death his executors sued the prior and convent for some of his property — a silver ewer and holy water stock, a counterpane and a dozen napkins. The friars declared that they belonged to the house, and the bishop had them in pledge, and asked that the trial of the case in Worcestershire might be stopped as detrimental to their interests. The friars may have been wronged, but it must be owned that their tale is not very plausible, for it is unlikely that they would pawn goods to a person in their debt.

Richard Yngworth
The house was subjected to an attack on its rights and property in 1533 by one Verney, when Thomas Cromwell showed himself disposed in their favour. Richard Yngworth, the prior, on 16 December sent him a present of apples, and thanked him for his help and counsel to the provincial superior, John Hilsey, by which he himself was enabled to serve God quietly and keep his study and office without trouble. Verney several months later was still causing the convent annoyance and loss, but the prior would not take steps against him without Cromwell's leave. Yngworth's attitude here expresses his policy, which was complete subservience to Cromwell, naturally for his own advancement. In April 1534 he went on a visitation to the eastern counties to secure the acknowledgement by the friars of the king's claim to be supreme head of the English Church, and later made himself useful to Hilsey elsewhere in the same business. The convent at Langley, needless to say, made the formal declaration required.

Yngworth's labours were not unnoticed. When Hilsey was made Bishop of Rochester, Thomas Bedell wrote to Cromwell recommending that the Prior of Langley, 'who had taken great pains in the king's matters,' should have the office of provincial; Russell also urged his appointment. The post, however, was not vacant, and Yngworth had to wait for preferment until December 1537, being then made Suffragan Bishop of Dover. Probably he ceased to be Prior of King's Langley from that time. He was commissioned by the king in February 1538 to visit all friaries in England, and in May he was ordered to put their goods into safe custody and take inventories of them, evidently in preparation for suppression. Langley was surrendered towards the end of that year. Many of the friars were very old and poor, but it is doubtful whether any provision was made for them. Yngworth begged for the house immediately, and in February 1540 it was granted to him with most of its lands, to be held until he obtained ecclesiastical benefices worth £100 a year. The priory was reckoned in the Valor of 1535 as worth £122 4s. a year clear, a fairly accurate estimate, to judge from the statement at the Dissolution. Its gross annual value was then said to be £130 16s. 8d., but to this must be added £11 13s. 4d. for the obits of Sir John Cheyne and Sir Ralph Verney, so that its net income after the deduction of £18 6s. 8d. for salaries and other payments was £124 3s. 4d.

It is impossible to ascertain the size of the convent at any period. Edward II intended the house to hold a hundred, but there is no proof that it ever did. His allowance of £50 extra for fifteen brothers in 1311 implies that there were then forty-five here. Edward III in 1356 gave licence to the nuns of Dartford to acquire land sufficient to maintain forty sisters and sixty friars, but the number he actually provided for at Langley from the Exchequer did not exceed twenty, apparently increased by twenty under his will.

Refounded
The priory of King's Langley was refounded by Philip and Mary in June 1557 as a house of Dominican sisters, at the request, and for the benefit of seven nuns, formerly at Ingress Abbey, Dartford, Kent. The prioress and convent were declared a corporate body, having perpetual succession and power to acquire property and to sue and be sued at law. They were given the house and site of the late friary, the land called 'le Courte Wike' in King's Langley which had belonged to the priory, and a house and buildings within 'the old manor' lying near the pales of the royal park.

On 8 September 1558 the king and queen granted to the Prioress and convent of Langley the reversion of certain tenements in Dartford, formerly demesne lands of the nuns of that place, and until the expiration of the lease, the rent of £30 7s. 7d. They gave also, besides other demesne lands, the house of the late nunnery with the property in Dartford assigned after its suppression to Anne of Cleves, and it has been supposed that the nuns now returned to Dartford. In any case, the convent's existence was very short. Queen Mary died in November of that year, and by an Act passed in Elizabeth's first Parliament all restorations or foundations of monasteries since the death of Edward VI were made void, and their possessions given to the Crown.

Present ownership
Early in the 20th century the property came into the ownership of Margaret Cross, who adapted it for use as a school. It is now united with the adjoining property, the site of Kings Langley Palace, in the ownership of the Rudolf Steiner School Kings Langley, which was closed in March 2019.

Other burials
Anne de Mortimer
Piers Gaveston, 1st Earl of Cornwall
Thomas Plantagenet,  twelfth child of King Edward III
Ralph Stafford (died 1385)

Priors of King's Langley
Elizabeth Cressener was the only prioress of Langley. Priors of King's Langley were:

John de Warefeld, 1308–15 
Robert de Duffeld, appointed 1315, occurs October 1316 and 1319 
Roger de Woderowe, occurs 1329 and 1340 
John de Dunstable, died c. 1343 
John Woderowe, occurs 9 June 1356 
Thomas Walsh, occurs 1374 
John, occurs October 1384 
William Syward, occurs January 1394-5 
Philip Boydon, occurs 1426 
John Henle, removed before May 1427
John de Hunden, D.D., resigned in 1458 on becoming Bishop of Llandaff 
William Wignale, S.T.D., occurs 16 July 1458 
Thomas Welles, occurs 14 July 1466 
Richard Wycherley, resigned on becoming Bishop of 'Olivence ' 
Thomas Powel or Poynes, occurs 1494 c. 1498 
Richard Wycherley, Bishop of 'Olivence,' appointed 1498-9, died c. 1502-3
Robert, occurs c. 1502-3 
Thomas Cowper, S.T.B., occurs 1519 
Robert Mylys or Miles, occurs 1522
Richard Yngworth, S.T.P., occurs 1530 and December 1537

Common seals
A 15th-century seal of the house, in shape a pointed oval, bears a representation of the Annunciation in a niche of very elaborate design, below which the royal founder kneels in prayer. On either side of him is a shield not of the arms of Edward II, but of France and England. Of the legend only two letters survive.

A later seal, also a pointed oval, represents the Christian God in majesty. In the base, under a carved four-centred arch, is the king as in the earlier seal. The inner border is engrailed. Legend: SIGILLUM : COVUNE : FRATRUM : PREDIB : DE : LANGELEYE.

A 16th-century seal, of the same shape but slightly larger, shows the coronation of the Virgin in a niche with two-arched canopy. On each side there is a smaller canopied niche; the one on the left containing St. Margaret, crowned, standing on the dragon, which she pierces with a long cross, and holding in her right hand a book; in that on the right is an archbishop with mitre and crozier. Below is the founder on his knees under a carved roundheaded arch; he holds a church and in front of him on the ground is his crown. Legend: . . . . VENT . MONAST'II DE LAN . . Y. The counterseal shows two impressions of a shield-shaped signet with arms, a bend engrailed between six fleurs de lis with three crosslets fitchy on the bend, the ownership of which is unknown.

See also 
 List of monastic houses in East Sussex

References

Notes
 This article is based on King's Langley Priory, in The Victoria History of the County of Hertford: Volume 4, 1971, a publication in the public domain.

Monasteries in Hertfordshire
Dominican monasteries in England
1308 establishments in England
Christian monasteries established in the 14th century
1538 disestablishments in England